Johannes Theodorus Viljoen (21 April 1943 – 13 January 2021) was a South African rugby union player.

Playing career
Viljoen represented  in the South African provincial competitions and made his debut for the union in 1965. With his retirement from rugby, he scored 43 tries for Natal, which was then the Natal record. He made his test debut for the Springboks during the 1971 tour of Australia on 17 July 1971 at the Sydney Cricket Ground.  Viljoen scored his first test try in his first test and his second try in the second test. He played in all three test matches during the tour and in seven of the tour matches, scoring fourteen tries in the tour matches.

Test history

See also
List of South Africa national rugby union players – Springbok no. 451

References

1943 births
2021 deaths
South African rugby union players
South Africa international rugby union players
Sharks (Currie Cup) players
People from Sakhisizwe Local Municipality
White South African people
Rugby union players from the Eastern Cape
Rugby union wings